Kalateh-ye Keyani (also Romanized as Kalāteh-ye Keyānī) is a village in Pol Khatun Rural District, Marzdaran District, Sarakhs County, Razavi Khorasan Province, Iran. At the 2006 census, its population was 123, in 25 families.

References 

Populated places in Sarakhs County